Wellington de Lima Gomes (born 21 March 1990) is a Brazilian footballer who plays as a goalkeeper Petro de Luanda- Angola.

References

1990 births
Living people
Brazilian footballers
Brazilian expatriate footballers
Association football goalkeepers
Primeira Liga players
C.S. Marítimo players
Expatriate footballers in Portugal
Sportspeople from Recife